This is the list of notable people who were born, lived or grew up in Quetta (the provincial capital of Balochistan province of Pakistan) and Quetta District. List is ordered by the professions of people.

Civil and military officers 
 Abdul Qadir Baloch
 Yazdan Khan
 Musa Khan
 Chris Keeble
 George Philip Bradley Roberts
 Ian Jacob
 James Cassels
 Patrick Hore-Ruthven
 Samad Ali Changezi
 Sharbat Ali Changezi

Film, radio and television people 
 Abid Ali
 Abid Ali Nazish
 Avice Landone
 Ayub Khoso Actor
 Hameed Sheikh Actor
 Humaima Malick
 Jamal Shah Actor 
 Merle Tottenham
 Nadia Afghan
 Neil North
 Suresh Oberoi
 Veena
 Zeba Bakhtiar

Journalists, poets and writers 
 Agha Sadiq
 Ali Baba Taj
 Alison Plowden
 Mohsin Changezi
 Muneer Ahmed Badini
 Russi Karanjia
 Siddiq Baloch
 Wajahat Saeed Khan
 Zafar Mairaj
 Hasrat Mithrvi

Musicians 
 Dawood Sarkhosh
 Faiz Mohammad Faizok
 Rabi Peerzada

Politicians and lawyers 

 Abdul Samad Khan Achakzai
Rozi Khan Kakar, Pakistani senator
 Ali Ahmad Kurd
 Habib Jalib Baloch
 Iftikhar Muhammad Chaudhry, chief justice (Supreme Court)
 Jan Ali Changezi
 Javaid Iqbal, former chief justice (Supreme Court)
 Labh Singh Saini
 Mohammad Anwar Khan Durrani
 Qazi Faez Isa, chief justice (Balochistan High Court)
 Qazi Muhammad Essa Pakistan Movement leader
 Raja Muhammad Fayyaz Ahmad, former chief justice (Balochistan High Court)
 Sardar Yaqoob Khan Nasar Member Senate of Pakistan/ Politician 
 Shahzada Rehmatullah Khan Saddozai Pakistan Movement Renowned activist and volunteer,
 Sima Samar
 Syed Nasir Ali Shah, Pakistani Parliamentarian
 Tariq Mahmood
 Younus Changezi Former Army officer /football player and Politician
 Yousef Pashtun
 Zeenat Karzai
 Haji Syed Hussain Hazara, Pakistani Senator

Scholars and Sufi saints 

 Sahibzada Mulavi Haji Ameen Ullah Naqshbandi

 Maulana Niaz Muhammad Durrani
 Sahibzada Mulavi Haji Janan Naqshbandi

Sportspersons 
 Abdul Wahid Durrani, footballer
 Abrar Hussain
 Asif Dar, boxer
 Aslam Bareach (born 1976), cricket umpire
 Bashir Shah, cricketer
 Bill Tancred, former athlete
 Fariba Rezayee, Judoka
 Hayatullah Khan Durrani, Legendary Cave explorer and Mountaineer
 Haider Ali, boxer
 Jawad Dawood, Canadian cricketer
 Lovell Wooldridge, cricketer 
 Meena Hazara, karateka
 Mohammad Abubakar Durrani, Canoeing athlete
 Mubarik Ali Shan, Shaolin martial arts Grandmaster
 Muhammad Waseem, boxer
 Nahida Khan, cricketer
 Nargis Hameedullah, karateka
 Nasim Khan, cricketer
 Pete Tancred, former athlete
 Shakeel Abbasi, field-hockey player
 Zeeshan Ashraf, field-hockey player

See also 
 List of Pakistanis

References

Quetta
Quetta District